Butterfly Man  is a 2002 Thai-British adventure-romantic drama film directed and written by Kaprice Kea and starring Stuart Laing and Napakpapha Nakprasitte.

Plot

Adam, an English backpacker, breaks up with his girlfriend immediately after arriving with her in Thailand. He then strikes out on his own, leaving Bangkok for Ko Samui. There, he meets Em, a young masseuse. At first, their relationship is innocent, but Adam soon grows frustrated and starts hitting the bars and becoming a sex tourist, or "butterfly man", flirting from woman to woman. Meanwhile, the ugly side of Samui starts to reveal itself, with a human trafficking, slavery, and prostitution ring, run by British mafia exposed. Adam gets in trouble with the British mafia. Em helps him get away, so the British mafia beats her severely. Adam manages to escape via small boat, taking Em with him. They get married on the boat but then Em dies. He keeps his promise to take her body to her home village and ends up staying in Thailand.

Cast
Stuart Laing as Adam 
Napakpapha Nakprasitte as Em 
Francis Magee as Joey 
Carl Henry Exantus as Michael
Gavan O'Herlihy as Bill Kincaid 
Abigail Good as No Name 
Vasa Vatcharayon as Noi 
Kirsty Mitchell as Kate

References

External links

 

2002 films
British romantic drama films
2000s English-language films
2002 romantic drama films
Films about interracial romance
Thai romantic drama films
2000s British films